Burkhard Reich (born 1 December 1964) is a German former professional footballer who played as a defender. He is currently the athletic director for Karlsruher SC II.

Reich began to play football for SG Dynamo Fürstenwalde and joined the youth academy of BFC Dynamo at 12-years-old in 1977. He then returned to SG Dynamo Fürstenwalde when he was 17 years old. He made his professional debut for SG Dynamo Fürstenwalde in the DDR-Liga in 1981. The coach of BFC Dynamo Jürgen Bogs was so impressed by Reich after a friendly match between SG Dynamo Fürstenwalde and BFC Dynamo that he decided to bring him back to BFC Dynamo during the 1985–86 season.  Reich scored his first goal in the DDR-Oberliga in the derby against 1. FC Union Berlin at the Stadion der Weltjugend on 13 September 1986. BFC Dynamo won the match with a massive 8-1.

Reich played 302 top-flight matches in (East) German football: 102 in the Oberliga and 200 in the Bundesliga.

Reich won six caps for East Germany between 1987 and 1990.

Honours
 DDR-Oberliga: 1986–87, 1987–88
 FDGB-Pokal: 1987–88, 1988–89
 DFB-Pokal finalist: 1995–96

External links

References

1964 births
Living people
German footballers
East German footballers
Association football defenders
East Germany international footballers
FSV Union Fürstenwalde players
Berliner FC Dynamo players
Karlsruher SC players
Bundesliga players
2. Bundesliga players
DDR-Oberliga players
People from Fürstenwalde
Footballers from Brandenburg